Randall is a surname of English and Irish origin. It is a cognate of the name Randolph meaning "shield-wolf", composed of rand "shield" plus úlfr "wolf". In Ireland, Randall may be an anglicized form of the Gaelic Mac Raghnaill meaning "son of raghnall". 

Randall is also used as a masculine given name, derived from the surname.

Notable people

A
 Addison Randall, American film actor
Adriana Randall, South African politician
 Alexander Randall, American (Wisconsin) politician
 Alexander Randall (Maryland politician), congressman, Attorney General of Maryland
 Alice Randall, African American author and songwriter
 Anne Randall, American model
 Archibald Randall, United States District Court judge
 Archibald N. Randall, American (Wisconsin) politician

B
 Benjamin Randall (disambiguation), several people
 Benjamin Randall (1749–1808), founder of Freewill Baptist Connexion in the United States
 Benjamin Randall (Maine politician) (1789–1859), American congressman
 Benjamin Randall (Wisconsin politician) (1793–1863), American politician
 Benjamin H. Randall (1823–1913), American politician from the state of Minnesota
 Bob Randall (Aboriginal Australian elder) (1929–2015), Aboriginal Australian elder, singer and community leader
 Bob Randall (baseball) (born 1948), American Major League Baseball player, 1976–1980
 Bob Randall (politician), politician in South Australia
 Brett Randall, (1884–1963), Australian little theatre director

C
 Chad Randall, Australian Rugby League player and model
 Charles Hiram Randall, American (California) politician
 Charles S. Randall, former US representative from Massachusetts
 Clarence B. Randall, American lawyer and businessman
 Clifford E. Randall, American politician
 Connor Randall, English football player

D
 Damarious Randall (born 1992), American football player
 Dana Randall, professor of theoretical computer science
 David Randall, English journalist, author, and comic
 Derek Randall, England cricketer
 Dick Randall, Australian public servant
 Don Randall (politician), Australian politician
 Dudley Randall, African-American poet and publisher

E, F
 Elizabeth Randall, American (New Jersey) politician
 Edwin M. Randall, Florida supreme court justice
 Elliott Randall, American guitarist
 Frankie Randall, boxer

G, H
 George Morton Randall, American general
 Harry Randall (disambiguation), several people
 Herbert Randall, American photographer
 Holly Randall, American erotic photographer

J
 Jack Randall (disambiguation), several people
 James Randall (murderer), convicted rapist and murderer
 James Ryder Randall, American journalist and poet
 Jan Randall, Canadian composer and pianist
 Jeff Randall (journalist)
 John Randall (disambiguation), several people
 Josh Randall, American television actor
 Julia Randall, American poet

K, L
 Ken Randall (1888–1947), Canadian ice hockey player
 Kikkan Randall (born 1982), American cross-country skier
 Leslie Randall (1828–1922), English Anglican clergyman
 Leslie Randall (actor) (1924–2020), English actor
 Lisa Randall (born 1962), American particle physicist
 Lynne Randall (1949–2007), Australian pop singer, changed last name to Randell.

M
 Marcus Randall, American football player
 Mark Randall, several people
 Marta Randall, science fiction writer
 Meg Randall, American film actress
 Merle Randall, American physical chemist
 Mike Randall (disambiguation), several people

N - R
 Paulette Randall, British theatre director
 Randall S. Randall, Australian businessman
 Robert Randall (disambiguation), several people
 Robert C. Randall (1948–2001), advocate of medical marijuana, founder of Alliance for Cannabis Therapeutics
 Robert Richard Randall (1750–1801), founder of Sailors' Snug Harbor in Staten Island, New York
 Robert Randall (photographer) (1918–1984), American photographer
 Robert Randall, joint pseudonym of American novelists Robert Silverberg and Randall Garrett
 Ron Randall, American comic book artist

S
 Samuel C. Randall, former mayor of Flint, Michigan 
 Samuel J. Randall, US congressman from Pennsylvania and Speaker of the House of Representatives
 Semeka Randall, American basketball player
 Stuart Randall, American actor
 Stuart Randall, Baron Randall of St Budeaux
 Sue Randall, originally Marion Burnside Randall (1935–1984), American actress
 Suzanna Randall, German astrophysicist
 Suze Randall, American model, photographer, and pornographer originally from England

T - V
 Terry Randall, Australian rugby league footballer
 Thomas Randall, multiple people
 Tony Randall, American comic actor
 Vicky Randall, Professor of Political Science

W - Z
 Walter Randall, British television actor
 William Randall, several people

References